Priče o snovima (trans. Tales of Dreams) is the fourth studio album by Serbian heavy metal band Alogia, released in 2012. The album featured softer, more hard rock-oriented sound than the band's previous releases, which were mostly progressive/power metal-oriented.

Track listing

Personnel
Nikola Mijić - vocals
Srđan Branković - guitar
Miroslav Branković - guitar
Vladimir Ranisavljević - bass guitar
Vladimir Đedović - keyboards
Mića Kovačević - drums

Guest musicians
Vukašin Brajić - vocals (on track 7)
Dean Clea - vocals (on track 10)

References

External links
Priče o snovima at Encyclopaedia Metallum

Alogia (band) albums
2012 albums
Serbian-language albums
Hard rock albums by Serbian artists